HMS Raleigh is a stone frigate (shore establishment), serving as the basic training facility of the Royal Navy at Torpoint, Cornwall, United Kingdom. It is spread over several square miles, and has damage control simulators and fire-fighting training facilities, as well as a permanently moored training ship, the former HMS Brecon. Its principal function is the delivery of both New Entry Training & Basic Training.

History
HMS Raleigh was commissioned on 9 January 1940 as a training establishment for Ordinary Seamen following the Military Training Act which required that all males aged 20 and 21 years old be called up for six months full-time military training, and then transferred to the reserve.

During the Second World War, 44 sailors and 21 Royal Engineers were killed when a German bomb hit the air-raid shelter they were in at Raleigh on 28 April 1941. In 1944, the United States Navy took over the base to use as an embarkation centre prior to the Invasion of Normandy. Raleigh was transferred back to the Royal Navy in July 1944 to continue training seamen.
Early in 1950 the base became the new entry and engineering training establishment for stoker mechanics. The cruiser  was used for "onboard training, boiler room, auxiliary machinery, ships boats etc". 
The base was modernised through the 1970s, and in the early 1980s, Raleigh took on the Part I training for the Women's Royal Naval Service, and Artificer Apprentices as well as adding the Royal Naval Supply School. Briefly between 1980 and 1981 it was home to Rowallan Division providing training before entry to BRNC Dartmouth.
The Cookery School closed in early 2022 with all activities being transferred to Worthy Down, with the Submarine School due to relocate upon the completion of the new Royal Navy Submarine Centre in Faslane. This is scheduled for 2027.

In 2007, phase one training for all new Royal Navy recruits was increased to nine weeks and subsequently ten (from eight) of their career at the base, which also provides courses in military training, seamanship, logistics and submarine operations. It also delivers training for crews preparing for operational deployments. HMS Raleigh was also the home of Defence Maritime Logistics School (DMLS) providing training for the Royal Navy's logistics officers, chefs, stewards,  clerks (called Writers), and supply chain ratings, the Seaman Specialist School (prior to its relocation to Worthy Down) the Submarine School and HM Royal Marines Band Plymouth.

Captain, New Entry Training Establishment (“HMS Raleigh”)
Post holders included:
 Rear-Admiral Charles Otway Alexander: October 1939-March 1944
 Captain Harold Hickling: September 1944-January 1945
 Captain Alexander H. Maxwell-Hyslop: January 1945-June 1946
 Captain George F. Stevens-Guille: June 1946-February 1948
 Captain Philip C. Taylor: February 1948-May 1949
 Captain Iain G. Maclean: May 1949-December 1950
 Captain William E.C. Davy: December 1950-September 1953
 Captain Ivan O. Backhouse: September 1953-June 1955
 Captain William G. Pulvertaft: June 1955-July 1957
 Captain Archibald G. Forman: July 1957-May 1959
 Captain John A. Osborne: May 1959-June 1961
 Captain George C. Crowley: June 1961-May 1963
 Captain Denis Jermain: May 1963-February 1965
 Captain Peter White: February 1965-March 1967
 Captain Peter G.R. Mitchell: March 1967-February 1969
 Captain James F.R. Weir: February 1969-April 1971
 Captain Malcolm C. Denman: April 1971-July 1973
 Captain Henry E. Howard: July 1973-February 1976
 Captain Robert W.F. Gerken: February 1976-February 1978
 Captain Richard E. Lambert: February 1978-October 1979
 Captain John Jacobsen: October 1979-March 1982
 Captain Brian R. Outhwaite: March 1982-February 1984
 Captain Brian T. Brown: February 1984-1985
 Captain Robert C.F. Hill: 1986-1987
 Captain Peter J. Grindal: October 1987-1989
 Captain John C.L. Wright: 1989-1991
 Captain Richard O. Irwin: April 1990-October 1992
 Captain Peter A. Dunt: October 1992-1994
 Captain Richard A.Y. Bridges: 1994-September 1995
 Commodore Hugh W. Rickard: September 1995-1998
 Commodore Roger G. Lockwood: 1998-2000
 Commodore Laurence P. Brokenshire: 2000-July 2003
 Commodore David W. Pond: July 2003-January 2006
 Commodore W. John Keegan: January 2006-January 2008
 Commodore S. Jonathan Woodcock: January 2008-December 2009
 Captain Stephen Murdoch: December 2009-September 2012
 Captain Robert Fancy: September 2012-September 2014
 Captain Robert J.A. Bellfield: September 2014-September 2016
 Captain Eleanor L. Ablett: September 2016-September 2018
 Captain Richard Harris: September 2018-September 2020
 Captain Suzi Nielsen: September 2020-September 2022
 Captain Jane Roe: September 2022-Present

References

Royal Navy bases in England
Military of the United Kingdom in Cornwall
World War II sites in England
Military training establishments of the United Kingdom
Royal Navy shore establishments
Training establishments of the Royal Navy